The 2016–17 Washington Wizards season was the 56th season of the franchise in the National Basketball Association (NBA) and 44th in the Washington, D.C. area. On April 14, 2016, the Wizards fired Randy Wittman after the team missed the playoffs. On April 26, 2016, the Wizards hired former Oklahoma City Thunder coach Scott Brooks to be their head coach. The Wizards clinched a playoff berth on their 129–108 victory over the Brooklyn Nets on Friday March 24, 2017 after having a one-season absence from the playoffs. On March 28, 2017, the Wizards defeated the Los Angeles Lakers 119–108 to win their first division title since 1979 ending their 38-year drought when they were named the Bullets.

The Wizards finished the regular season with a 49–33 record, securing the 4th seed. In the playoffs, the Wizards defeated the Atlanta Hawks in six games in the First Round, advancing to the Semifinals, where they lost to the Boston Celtics in a hard fought seven games.

Draft picks

The Wizards did not have a pick in the 2016 NBA draft, as they had traded both picks prior to the draft:

 The first-round pick was traded away to the Phoenix Suns along with Kris Humphries and DeJuan Blair in exchange for Markieff Morris.
 The second-round pick was traded away to the Atlanta Hawks, along with the rights to Jerian Grant and a second-round pick in the 2019 NBA draft, to allow the Wizards to move up in the 2015 NBA draft and acquire the rights to Kelly Oubre Jr.

Roster

Standings

Division

Conference

Game log

Pre-season

|- style="background:#fcc
| 1 
| October 4
| Miami
| 
| Kelly Oubre Jr. (16)
| Marcin Gortat (6)
| Tomas Satoransky (6)
| Verizon Center9,100
| 0–1
|- style="background:#cfc
| 2 
| October 6
| @ Philadelphia
| 
| Kelly Oubre Jr. (24)
| Jason Smith (7)
| Tomas Satoransky (6)
| Wells Fargo Center10,440
| 1–1
|- style="background:#fcc
| 3 
| October 10
| @ New York
| 
| Bradley Beal (17)
| Bryant III, Oubre Jr. (7)
| John Wall (4)
| Madison Square Garden19,033
| 1–2
|- style="background:#cfc
| 4 
| October 13
| Philadelphia
| 
| Bradley Beal (22)
| Andrew Nicholson (12)
| John Wall (9)
| Verizon Center10,242
| 2–2
|- style="background:#fcc
| 5 
| October 15
| @ Sacramento
| 
| Kelly Oubre Jr. (15)
| Andrew Nicholson (5)
| Trey Burke (10)
| Rupp Arena8,472
| 2–3
|- style="background:#cfc
| 6 
| October 18
| @ Cleveland
| 
| John Wall (17)
| Marcin Gortat (13)
| Bradley Beal (5)
| Value City Arena18,104
| 3–3
|- style="background:#cfc
| 7 
| October 21
| Toronto
| 
| Beal, Morris (19)
| Marcin Gortat (8)
| John Wall (11)
| Verizon Center11,967
| 4–3

Regular season

|- style="background:#fcc"
| 1
| October 27
| @ Atlanta
| 
| Markieff Morris (22)
| Marcin Gortat (11)
| John Wall (10)
| Philips Arena19,049
| 0–1
|- style="background:#fcc"
| 2
| October 30
| @ Memphis
| 
| John Wall (22)
| Marcin Gortat (12)
| John Wall (13) 
| FedExForum15,573
| 0–2

|- style="background:#fcc;"
| 3
| November 2
| Toronto
| 
| Markieff Morris (22)
| Otto Porter Jr. (13)
| John Wall (11)
| Verizon Center19,581
| 0–3
|- style="background:#cfc"
| 4
| November 4
| Atlanta
| 
| Bradley Beal (28)
| Marcin Gortat (12)
| John Wall (6)
| Verizon Center14,663
| 1–3
|- style="background:#fcc;"
| 5
| November 5
| @ Orlando
| 
| Markieff Morris (18)
| Marcin Gortat (14)
| Morris, Beal, Satoranský (18)
| Amway Center18,846
| 1–4
|- style="background:#fcc;"
| 6
| November 7
| Houston
|  
| John Wall (21)
| Marcin Gortat (12)
| John Wall (8) 
| Verizon Center13,173
| 1–5
|- style="background:#cfc"
| 7
| November 9
| Boston
| 
| Otto Porter Jr. (34)
| Otto Porter Jr. (14)
| John Wall (7) 
| Verizon Center12,675
| 2–5
|- style="background:#fcc"
| 8
| November 11
| Cleveland
| 
| John Wall (28)
| Marcin Gortat (15)
| Otto Porter Jr. (5)
| Verizon Center20,356
| 2–6
|- style="background:#fcc"
| 9
| November 12
| @ Chicago
| 
| Markieff Morris (24)
| Markieff Morris (15)
| Tomáš Satoranský (9)
| United Center21,962
| 2–7
|- style="background:#fcc"
| 10
| November 16
| @ Philadelphia
| 
| John Wall (27)
| Marcin Gortat (14)
| John Wall (6)  
| Wells Fargo Center14,863
| 2–8
|- style="background:#cfc"
| 11
| November 17
| New York
| 
| John Wall (23)
| Gortat, Morris, Porter Jr. (8)
| John Wall (11)
| Verizon Center16,704
| 3–8
|- style="background:#fcc"
| 12
| November 19
| Miami
| 
| Wall, Beal (34)  
| Marcin Gortat (16)
| John Wall (8)  
| Verizon Center15,848
| 3–9
|- style="background:#cfc"
| 13
| November 21
| Phoenix
| 
| Bradley Beal (42)  
| Marcin Gortat (13)
| John Wall (15) 
| Verizon Center12,790
| 4–9
|- style="background:#cfc"
| 14
| November 25
| @ Orlando
| 
| John Wall (26)  
| Marcin Gortat (9)
| John Wall (10)  
| Amway Center17,103
| 5–9
|- style="background:#fcc"
| 15
| November 26
| San Antonio
| 
| Bradley Beal (25)
| Marcin Gortat (10)
| Wall, Beal (5)  
| Verizon Center17,066
| 5–10
|- style="background:#cfc"
| 16
| November 28
| Sacramento
| 
| Bradley Beal (31)
| Otto Porter Jr. (10)
| John Wall (11)  
| Verizon Center12,571
| 6–10
|- style="background:#fcc"
| 17
| November 30
| @ Oklahoma City
| 
| Bradley Beal (31)  
| Marcin Gortat (11)
| John Wall (15)
| Chesapeake Energy Arena18,203
| 6–11

|- style="background:#fcc"
| 18
| December 2
| @ San Antonio
| 
| Bradley Beal (23)  
| Marcin Gortat (18)
| John Wall (15)
| AT&T Center18,418
| 6–12
|- style="background:#cfc"
| 19
| December 5
| @ Brooklyn
| 
| John Wall (25)  
| Marcin Gortat (12)
| John Wall (13) 
| Barclays Center12,529
| 7–12
|- style="background:#fcc;"
| 20
| December 6
| Orlando
| 
| John Wall (52)  
| Marcin Gortat (11)
| John Wall (8)
| Verizon Center12,116
| 7–13
|- style="background:#cfc;"
| 21
| December 8
| Denver
| 
| Bradley Beal (26)
| Gortat, Wall (7)
| Wall, Beal (5) 
| Verizon Center12,645
| 8–13
|- style="background:#cfc;"
| 22
| December 10
| Milwaukee
| 
| John Wall (24)  
| Marcin Gortat (11)
| John Wall (11)
| Verizon Center14,816
| 9–13
|- style="background:#fcc;"
| 23
| December 12
| @ Miami
| 
| John Wall (30)  
| Marcin Gortat (10)
| John Wall (8)
| American Airlines Arena19,600
| 9–14
|-style="background:#cfc;"
| 24
| December 14
| Charlotte
| 
| John Wall (25)  
| Marcin Gortat (12)
| John Wall (10)
| Verizon Center13,447
| 10–14
|-style="background:#cfc;"
| 25
| December 16
| Detroit
| 
| John Wall (29)  
| Marcin Gortat (14)
| John Wall (11)
| Verizon Center15,573
| 11–14
|-style="background:#cfc;"
| 26
| December 18
| LA Clippers
| 
| Bradley Beal (41)
| Markieff Morris (9)
| John Wall (11)
| Verizon Center17,380
| 12–14
|- style="background:#fcc;"
| 27
| December 19
| @ Indiana
| 
| Bradley Beal (22)
| Marcin Gortat (13)
| John Wall (10)
| Bankers Life Fieldhouse17,686
| 12–15
|- style="background:#cfc;"
| 28
| December 21
| @ Chicago
| 
| John Wall (23)
| Gortat, Morris (11)
| John Wall (9)
| United Center21,358
| 13–15
|- style="background:#fcc;"
| 29
| December 23
| @ Milwaukee
| 
| Wall, Porter Jr. (18)
| Marcin Gortat (6)
| John Wall (10)
| BMO Harris Bradley Center15,921
| 13–16
|- style="background:#cfc;"
| 30
| December 26
| Milwaukee
| 
| Otto Porter Jr. (32)
| Otto Porter Jr. (13)
| John Wall (16)
| Verizon Center15,773
| 14–16
|- style="background:#cfc;"
| 31
| December 28
| Indiana
| 
| John Wall (36)
| Marcin Gortat (8)
| John Wall (11)
| Verizon Center16,172
| 15–16
|- style="background:#cfc;"
| 32
| December 30
| Brooklyn
| 
| Trey Burke (27)
| Gortat (13)
| John Wall (14)
| Verizon Center16,461
| 16–16

|- style="background:#fcc;"
| 33
| January 2
| @ Houston
| 
| Bradley Beal (27)
| Marcin Gortat (14)
| John Wall (12)
| Toyota Center16,569
| 16–17
|- style="background:#fcc;"
| 34
| January 3
| @ Dallas
| 
| John Wall (27)
| Marcin Gortat (16)
| John Wall (8)
| American Airlines Center19,318
| 16–18
|- style="background:#cfc;"
| 35
| January 6
| Minnesota
| 
| Bradley Beal (22)
| Marcin Gortat (10)
| John Wall (18)
| Verizon Center18,686
| 17–18
|- style="background:#cfc;"
| 36
| January 8
| @ Milwaukee
| 
| Bradley Beal (25)
| Marcin Gortat (12)
| John Wall (7)
| BMO Harris Bradley Center15,311
| 18–18
|- style="background:#cfc"
| 37
| January 10
| Chicago
| 
| John Wall (26)
| Marcin Gortat (12)
| John Wall (14)
| Verizon Center14,361
| 19–18
|- style="background:#fcc"
| 38
| January 11
| @ Boston
| 
| Bradley Beal (35)
| Gortat, Morris (9)
| John Wall (10)
| TD Garden18,624
| 19–19
|- style="background:#cfc"
| 39
| January 14
| Philadelphia
| 
| John Wall (25)
| Marcin Gortat (10)
| John Wall (7)
| Verizon Center17,880
| 20–19
|- style="background:#cfc;"
| 40
| January 16
| Portland
| 
| Bradley Beal (25)
| Markieff Morris (13)
| John Wall (7)
| Verizon Center17,395
| 21–19
|- style="background:#cfc;"
| 41
| January 18
| Memphis
| 
| Wall, Porter Jr. (18)
| Markieff Morris (12)
| John Wall (13)
| Verizon Center15,079
| 22–19
|- style="background:#cfc"
| 42
| January 19
| @ New York
| 
| John Wall (29)
| Marcin Gortat (12)
| John Wall (13)
| Madison Square Garden19,812
| 23–19
|- style="background:#fcc"
| 43
| January 21
| @ Detroit
| 
| John Wall (19)
| Markieff Morris (9)
| John Wall (10)
| The Palace of Auburn Hills18,231
| 23–20
|-style="background:#cfc"
| 44
| January 23
| @ Charlotte
| 
| John Wall (24)
| Otto Porter Jr. (13)
| John Wall (7)
| Spectrum Center15,285
| 24–20
|- style="background:#cfc"
| 45
| January 24
| Boston
| 
| Bradley Beal (31)
| Markieff Morris (11)
| John Wall (7)
| Verizon Center16,387
| 25–20
|- style="background:#cfc"
| 46
| January 27
| @ Atlanta
| 
| Otto Porter Jr. (21)
| Marcin Gortat (12)
| John Wall (9)
| Philips Arena16,969
| 26–20
|- style= "background:#cfc;"
| 47
| January 29
| @ New Orleans
| 
| Bradley Beal (27)
| Marcin Gortat (11)
| John Wall (19)
| Smoothie King Center 16,779
| 27–20
|- style="background:#cfc;"
| 48
| January 31
| New York
| 
| Bradley Beal (28)
| Gortat, Morris (10)
| John Wall (13)
| Verizon Center16,683
| 28–20

|- style="background:#cfc;"
| 49
| February 2
| L. A. Lakers
| 
| John Wall (33)
| Marcin Gortat (14)
| John Wall (11)
| Verizon Center16,473
| 29–20
|- style= "background:#cfc;"
| 50
| February 4
| New Orleans
| 
| John Wall (24)
| Marcin Gortat (17)
| John Wall (13)
| Verizon Center19,651
| 30–20
|- style= "background:#fcc;"
| 51
| February 6
| Cleveland
| 
| Bradley Beal (41)
| Marcin Gortat (8)
| John Wall (12)
| Verizon Center20,356
| 30–21
|- style="background:#cfc;"
| 52
| February 8
| @ Brooklyn
| 
| Bradley Beal (31)
| Marcin Gortat (14)
| John Wall (12)
| Barclays Center13,179
| 31–21
|- style= "background:#cfc;"
| 53
| February 10
| Indiana
| 
| John Wall (26)
| Marcin Gortat (16)
| John Wall (14)
| Verizon Center19,503
| 32–21
|- style= "background:#cfc;"
| 54
| February 13
| Oklahoma City
| 
| Bradley Beal (22)
| Otto Porter Jr. (12)
| John Wall (7)
| Verizon Center20,356
| 33–21
|- style= "background:#cfc;"
| 55
| February 16
| @ Indiana
| 
| Otto Porter Jr. (25)
| Otto Porter Jr. (8)
| John Wall (12)
| Bankers Life Fieldhouse17,233
| 34–21
|- style="background:#fcc;"
| 56
| February 24
| @ Philadelphia
| 
| Bradley Beal (40)
| Marcin Gortat (11)
| John Wall (14)
| Wells Fargo Center19,277
| 34–22
|- style="background:#fcc;"
| 57
| February 26
| Utah
| 
| John Wall (23)
| Marcin Gortat (8)
| John Wall (11)
| Verizon Center19,648
| 34–23
|- style="background:#cfc;"
| 58
| February 28
| Golden State
| 
| Bradley Beal (25)
| Marcin Gortat (12)
| John Wall (19)
| Verizon Center20,356
| 35–23

|- style="background:#cfc;"
| 59
| March 1
| @ Toronto
| 
| Bojan Bogdanovic (27)
| Marcin Gortat (8)
| John Wall (13)
| Air Canada Centre19,800
| 36–23
|- style="background:#fcc;"
| 60
| March 3
| Toronto
| 
| John Wall (30)
| Otto Porter Jr., Morris, Wall (8)
| John Wall (7)
| Verizon Center20,356
| 36–24
|- style="background:#cfc;"
| 61
| March 5
| Orlando
| 
| Bradley Beal (32)
| Marcin Gortat (11)
| John Wall (10)
| Verizon Center19,195
| 37–24
|- style="background:#cfc;"
| 62
| March 7
| @ Phoenix
| 
| Bojan Bogdanovic (29)
| Mahinmi, Bogdanovic (9)
| John Wall (14) 
| Talking Stick Resort Arena16,372
| 38–24
|- style="background:#cfc;"
| 63
| March 8
| @ Denver
| 
| John Wall (30)
| Marcin Gortat (15)
| John Wall (10)
| Pepsi Center12,323
| 39–24
|- style="background:#cfc;"
| 64
| March 10
| @ Sacramento
|  
| Bradley Beal (38)
| Bradley Beal (10)
| John Wall (12)
| Golden 1 Center17,608
| 40–24
|- style="background:#cfc;"
| 65
| March 11
| @ Portland
|  
| John Wall (39)
| Marcin Gortat (15)
| John Wall (9)
| Moda Center19,482
| 41–24
|- style="background:#fcc;"
| 66
| March 13
| @ Minnesota
|  
| John Wall (27)
| Beal, Morris, Mahinmi (7)
| Jennings, Wall (5)
| Target Center15,747
| 41–25
|- style="background:#fcc;"
| 67
| March 15
| Dallas
|  
| John Wall (26)
| Otto Porter Jr., Gortat (10)
| John Wall (11)
| Verizon Center17,844
| 41–26
|- style="background:#cfc;"
| 68
| March 17
| Chicago
| 
| Bradley Beal (24)
| Otto Porter Jr., Gortat (10)
| John Wall (20)
| Verizon Center20,356
| 42–26
|-style="background:#fcc;"
| 69
| March 18
| @ Charlotte
| 
| John Wall (19)
| Marcin Gortat (16)
| John Wall (8)
| Spectrum Center19,361
| 42–27
|- style="background:#fcc;"
| 70
| March 20
| @ Boston
| 
| Bradley Beal (19)
| Bojan Bogdanovic (6)
| John Wall (8)
| TD Garden18,624
| 42–28
|- style="background:#cfc;"
| 71
| March 22
| Atlanta
| 
| Bradley Beal (28)
| Ian Mahinmi (10)
| John Wall (10)
| Verizon Center18,137
| 43–28
|- style="background:#cfc;"
| 72
| March 24
| Brooklyn
| 
| John Wall (22)
| Marcin Gortat (9)
| Jennings, Wall (9)
| Verizon Center19,616
| 44–28
|- style= "background:#cfc;"
| 73
| March 25
| @ Cleveland
| 
| John Wall (37)
| Otto Porter Jr. (7)
| John Wall (11)
| Quicken Loans Arena 20,562
| 45–28
|- style= "background:#cfc;"
| 74
| March 28
| @ L. A. Lakers
| 
| John Wall (34)
| Marcin Gortat (10)
| John Wall (14)
| Staples Center 18,997
| 46–28
|- style= "background:#fcc;"
| 75
| March 29
| @ L. A. Clippers
| 
| John Wall (41)
| Mahinmi, Smith (8)
| John Wall (8)
| Staples Center 19,060
| 46–29
|- style="background:#fcc;"
| 76
| March 31
| @ Utah
| 
| Bradley Beal (27)
| Marcin Gortat (11)
| John Wall (5)
| Vivint Smart Home Arena19,911
| 46–30

|- style="background:#fcc;"
| 77
| April 2
| @ Golden State
| 
| Bradley Beal (20)
| Brandon Jennings (7)
| John Wall (11)
| Oracle Arena19,596
| 46–31
|- style="background:#cfc;"
| 78
| April 4
| Charlotte
| 
| John Wall (23)
| Markieff Morris (6)
| John Wall (13)
| Verizon Center18,614
| 47–31
|- style="background:#cfc;"
| 79
| April 6
| @ New York
| 
| Bradley Beal (25)
| Otto Porter Jr. (9)
| John Wall (8)
| Madison Square Garden19,812
| 48–31
|- style="background:#fcc;"
| 80
| April 8
| Miami
| 
| Markieff Morris (21)
| Marcin Gortat (11)
| John Wall (8)
| Verizon Center20,365
| 48–32
|- style="background:#cfc;"
| 81
| April 10
| @ Detroit
| 
| Bradley Beal (33)
| Ian Mahinmi (11)
| John Wall (6)
| The Palace of Auburn Hills21,012
| 49–32
|- style="background:#fcc;"
| 82
| April 12
| @ Miami
| 
| Trey Burke (27)
| Otto Porter Jr. (6)
| Jennings, Satoransky (5)
| AmericanAirlines Arena19,963
| 49–33

Playoffs

|- style="background:#cfc;"
| 1
| April 16
| Atlanta
| 
| John Wall (32)
| Marcin Gortat (10)
| John Wall (14)
| Verizon Center20,356
| 1–0
|- style="background:#cfc;"
| 2
| April 19
| Atlanta
| 
| John Wall (32)
| Marcin Gortat (10)
| John Wall (9)
| Verizon Center20,356
| 2–0
|- style="background:#fcc;"
| 3
| April 22
| @ Atlanta
| 
| John Wall (29)
| Marcin Gortat (8)
| John Wall (7)
| Philips Arena18,729
| 2–1
|- style="background:#fcc;"
| 4
| April 24
| @ Atlanta
| 
| Bradley Beal (32)
| Marcin Gortat (18)
| John Wall (10)
| Philips Arena18,676
| 2–2
|- style="background:#cfc;"
| 5
| April 26
| Atlanta
| 
| Bradley Beal (27)
| Marcin Gortat (10)
| John Wall (14)
| Verizon Center20,356
| 3–2
|- style="background:#cfc;"
| 6
| April 28
| @ Atlanta
| 
| John Wall (42)
| Morris, Porter (8)
| John Wall (8)
| Philips Arena18,746
| 4–2

|- style="background:#fcc;"
| 1
| April 30 
| @ Boston
| 
| Bradley Beal (27)
| Marcin Gortat (13)
| John Wall (16)
| TD Garden18,624
| 0–1
|- style="background:#fcc;"
| 2
| May 2
| @ Boston
| 
| John Wall (40)
| Marcin Gortat (10)
| John Wall (13)
| TD Garden18,624
| 0–2
|- style="background:#cfc;"
| 3
| May 4
| Boston
| 
| John Wall (24)
| Marcin Gortat (16)
| John Wall (8)
| Verizon Center20,356
| 1–2
|- style="background:#cfc;"
| 4
| May 7
| Boston
| 
| Bradley Beal (29)
| Markieff Morris (10)
| John Wall (12)
| Verizon Center20,356
| 2–2
|- style="background:#fcc;"
| 5
| May 10 
| @ Boston
| 
| John Wall (21)
| Marcin Gortat (11)
| Bogdanovic, Beal, Wall (4)
| TD Garden18,624
| 2–3
|- style="background:#cfc;"
| 6
| May 12
| Boston
| 
| Bradley Beal (33)
| Marcin Gortat (13)
| John Wall (8)
| Verizon Center20,356
| 3–3
|- style="background:#fcc;"
| 7
| May 15
| @ Boston
| 
| Bradley Beal (38)
| Marcin Gortat (11)
| John Wall (11)
| TD Garden18,624
| 3–4

Transactions

Trades

Free Agents

Re-signed

Additions

Subtractions

Awards

References

Washington Wizards seasons
Washington Wizards
Washington Wizards
Washington Wizards